Caguas is a city and municipality of Puerto Rico located in the Central Mountain Range of Puerto Rico, south of San Juan and Trujillo Alto, west of Gurabo and San Lorenzo, and east of Aguas Buenas, Cidra, and Cayey. Caguas was founded in 1775. The municipality had a population of 127,244 at the 2020 census.

It is located in the Valle de Caguas or Caguas Valley (also known as Valle del Turabo or the Turabo Valley), at the eastern ranges of the Central Mountain Range. It is known as La Ciudad Criolla (Criollo City), Valle del Turabo (the Turabo Valley) and La Cuna de los Trovadores (The Cradle of the Trovadores). Its name originates from the Taíno cacique Caguax, who was a regional chief. Caguas is a principal city of both the San Juan-Caguas-Guaynabo Metropolitan Statistical Area and the San Juan-Caguas-Fajardo Combined Statistical Area.

History
The area of the Valley of Caguas was first settled by the Saladoid culture, an Arawak culture which originated in northern South America (today Venezuela), approximately between the years 100 BCE to 600 CE. Findings from the Cagüitas archaeological site (CS-2) indicate that the area was later inhabited by various pre-Taíno (Ostionoid) cultures which first developed agriculture in the valley, primarily the cultivation of cassava, and hunted now extinct species such as hutias. As with the rest of Puerto Rico, the Taínos were the primary group living in the valley at the time of the Spanish arrival. The Spanish conquistadors further developed the agriculture in the valley, while also establishing mines in search of gold, silver and copper. Most of the native Taínos living in the area were either forced out or taken as slaves and moved to the Real Hacienda del Toa (in modern day Toa Alta and Toa Baja). Most of the valley was later cleared of its original vegetation for the development of cattle farms such as Hato de Bairoa, Hato de Caguax and Hato de Gurabo.Caguas was officially founded on January 1, 1775, as San Sebastián del Piñal de Caguax, with the name later being shortened and modernized to its current form. The name of the city comes from Caguax, a local Taíno chief and early convert to Christianity. The site of the historic downtown area of Caguas and its central square dates to 1779. In 1820 the settlement was granted the title of Villa and it was granted city rights in 1894. Sugarcane was the primary crop during this time and important sugarcane plantations and refineries were those of Central Santa Juana (close to modern day Plaza Centro) and Central Santa Catalina (modern day Las Catalinas Mall). The Carretera Central, which is the first paved road to cross Puerto Rico from north to south connecting San Juan to Ponce, was built during the last two decades of the 19th century, made Caguas more accessible therefore causing the population of the town to grow even more.

Puerto Rico was ceded by Spain in the aftermath of the Spanish–American War under the terms of the Treaty of Paris of 1898 and became a territory of the United States. In 1899, the United States Department of War conducted a census of Puerto Rico finding that the population of Caguas was 19,857.

The city grew considerably in size during the 1970s and quickly became an exurb of San Juan to the north due to its location. The region of Caguas became an important pharmaceuticals manufacturing center during this time. Pharmaceutical companies originally came to Puerto Rico in the late 1960s and 1970s to take advantage of the now-expired federal tax incentive known as Section 936. This incentive allowed U.S.-based manufacturers to send all profits from local plants to stateside parent plants without having to pay any federal taxes.

Although not typically seen as part of the colloquial Área Metro of San Juan (San Juan, Cataño, Bayamón, Guaynabo and Carolina), the municipality of Caguas is located in the census-based San Juan Metropolitan Area due to its role as a commuter town. The average commute time for residents of the municipality is 30.5 minutes. Caguas is the fourth most populous city in the San Juan Metropolitan region and the most populous city in Puerto Rico that is not located in a coastal area.

On August 7, 2002, Caguas was the site of the 2002 USAF Hercules air disaster, where all 10 military personnel on board lost their lives after an airplane carrying them struck a mountain in the south of the municipality.

Hurricane Maria on September 20, 2017, triggered numerous landslides in Caguas with its wind and rain. Rivers were breached causing flooding of low-lying areas, and infrastructure and homes were destroyed. The hurricane caused $90 million in damages in Caguas. More specifically, 40 homes were left where left without a roof and 30 were flooded in the Morales neighborhood. Escuela Segunda Unidad Diego Vázquez and the Centro Multiusos flooded as well. A pipe overflowed and the smell was mixed last week with that of the waste that they have not been able to finish cleaning, according to what neighbors told El Nuevo Día.

Geography

The city and municipality of Caguas are located approximately 30 minutes from the coastline both on the east (Humacao) and the north (San Juan). It is east of Aguas Buenas and Cidra, north of Cayey, south of San Juan, and west of Gurabo and Trujillo Alto. It also shares borders with Guayama and Patillas via a five-point border at the summit of Cerro La Santa, with Cayey and San Lorenzo. This is the tallest point of the Sierra de Cayey, not to be confused with Montaña Santa (officially called Cerro de Nuestra Madre) which is another mountain in the same massif located on the boundary between the municipalities of Patillas and San Lorenzo. At this point there are two tall antennas which provide signal to Puerto Rico's principal TV stations such as WKAQ-TV and WAPA-TV. No road passes exactly at this point, and it can be approached nearby through Puerto Rico Highway 184.

Valle de Caguas 

The city is located in one of the largest valleys in Puerto Rico, the Valle de Caguas or Caguas Valley (also known as Valle del Turabo or the Turabo Valley). Being located in a valley, Caguas has the distinction of being relatively flat except near the borders with all the mentioned municipalities except Gurabo. The valley is bordered by the Altos de La Mesa and San Luis ranges in the north, the Sierra de Luquillo on the northeast, the San Lorenzo batholith to the east, the Sierra de Cayey on the south and the main range of the Cordillera Central to the west.

This valley is fed mainly by the Grande de Loíza River, one of Puerto Rico's major rivers that feed into the Atlantic Ocean, and numerous tributaries such as the Cagüitas, along which the contemporary settlement of Caguas was built. The city's nickname Valle del Turabo comes from the Turabo River, which is another tributary that flows from the south. The Gurabo River, another major tributary, feeds into the Grande de Loíza at a region where the valley narrows into a rift valley that runs from west to east and ends in Humacao in the southeastern coast of the island.

As with other parts of Puerto Rico, the region of Caguas is susceptible to earthquakes. The municipality is located along the Great Northern Puerto Rico fault zone (GNPRfz) and in recent times the region experienced moderate size earthquakes in 1990 and 2010.

Water features
The Río Grande de Loíza divides the municipality from Gurabo.
Other rivers: Río Turabo, Río Cagüitas, Río Cañaboncito, Río Bairoa and Río Cañas.

Climate

The climate is classified as a Tropical monsoon climate, meaning the daily mean temperature from month to month is never less than 64.4 °F (18 °C), and there is a distinct wet and dry season. Rainfall is common in relative abundance throughout most of the year, although there is less rain than in the eastern coastal valleys. The land, however, is fertile and deep.

Barrios

Like all municipalities of Puerto Rico, Caguas is subdivided into barrios:

 Caguas barrio-pueblo
 Bairoa
 Beatriz
 Borinquen
 Cañabón
 Cañaboncito
 Río Cañas
 San Antonio
 San Salvador
 Tomás de Castro
 Turabo

Sectors
Barrios (which are like minor civil divisions) and subbarrios, in turn, are further subdivided into smaller local populated place areas/units called sectores (sectors in English). The types of sectores may vary, from normally sector to urbanización to reparto to barriada to residencial, among others.

Special Communities

 (Special Communities of Puerto Rico) are marginalized communities whose citizens are experiencing a certain amount of social exclusion. A map shows these communities occur in nearly every municipality of the commonwealth. Of the 742 places that were on the list in 2014, the following barrios, communities, sectors, or neighborhoods were in Caguas: Bairoa La 25, Morales neighborhood, Parcelas Viejas in Borinquén, Sector La Barra, and Comunidad La Quebrada in Río Cañas, Hoyo Frío in Las Carolinas, Lajitas, Las Carolinas, Los Muchos, Los Panes in Beatriz, and Savarona.

Tourism

Landmarks and places of interest
There are seven places in Caguas listed on the US National Register of Historic Places:
Caguas City Hall (the city hall building)
Primera Iglesia Bautista de Caguas
Gautier Benítez High School

Puente No. 6 or 
Carretera Central
Other landscapes, landmarks and tourist attractions in Caguas include:
Caguas Museum of Art
Caguas Museum of Folk Arts
Caguas Museum of History
Caguas Tobacco Museum
Dulce Nombre de Jesús Cathedral (Catedral de Caguas), the old city hall and other historical buildings at Plaza Palmer, the main town square.
Hacienda Catalina Ruins, located in the area of Las Catalinas Mall
Hacienda Country Club
La Casa del Ajedrez (The House of Chess)

Parks and natural areas 
The municipality of Caguas is home to various parks and natural protected areas managed by different governmental entities ranging from the municipal government, the Puerto Rico Department of Natural and Environmental Resources, the Puerto Rico Conservation Trust, and the United States Fish & Wildlife Service.

 Aguas Buenas Cave and Caverns System Nature Reserve, an extensive cave system partially located in the municipality of Caguas.
 Bairoa River Natural Protected Area, protected riparian forest along the Bairoa River.
 Borinquen Valley Natural Area, 25 acres of protected forest located in barrio Borinquen.
 Caguas Real Nature Reserve, 60 acres of riparian forest along the Turabo River managed by the United States Fish & Wildlife Service.
 Caguas Regional Forest, a protected secondary forest and riparian ecosystem along the Turabo River.
 Carite State Forest and Reserve, one of the 20 units in the state forest system of Puerto Rico, partially located in Caguas.
 Cerro Borrás, formerly home to various recreational parks such as Moisty Park, currently preserved as a secondary forest.
 Chalets de Bairoa Natural Area, currently being developed as a preserved ecological corridor within the Valley of Caguas.
 Charco El Cantil, natural swimming pool located along the Turabo River.
 Finca Longo and Altos de San Luis, partially managed by the DRNA forest service and the municipality of Caguas.
 Jardín Botánico y Cultural William Miranda Marín (Botanical and Cultural Gardens), botanical garden and cultural institution containing the ruins of the Hacienda San José plantation and Taíno archaeological sites, located in barrio Cañabón.
 Jorge Sotomayor del Toro Protected Natural Area, a protected natural area located adjacent to the Carite Forest.

Voy Turistiendo Campaign 
To stimulate local tourism during the COVID-19 pandemic in Puerto Rico, the Puerto Rico Tourism Company launched the Voy Turistiendo (I'm Touring) campaign in 2021. The campaign featured a passport book with a page for each municipality.

Culture

Festivals and events
Caguas celebrates its patron saint festival in July. The  is a religious and cultural celebration that generally features parades, games, artisans, amusement rides, regional food, and live entertainment.

Other festivals and events include:
 – 4 January
Three Kings Festival – 5 January
Criolla Beatriz – February
Criolla Borinquen Fair – March
Criolla Cañabón Fair – April
Felipe "La Voz" Rodríguez' Birthday – 8 May
Al Fresco – Every last Friday of each month
Cross Festival – 23–31 May
Typical Criole Festival – 1–2 June
Latin American Musical

Sports
The Criollos de Caguas baseball team is considered one of the greatest of all-time in all of Latin America, having won 18 national Puerto Rico titles and 5 Caribbean World Series titles The team is a member of the Liga de Béisbol Profesional de Puerto Rico (LBPPR). Three of the first five Puerto Ricans that played Major League Baseball in the U.S. mainland, at one point in their careers played for the Criollos de Caguas (Luis Rodríguez Olmo, Victor Pellot Power, Roberto Clemente).

The Criollos de Caguas basketball team, founded in 1968 by Dr. Héctor "Tato" Dávila and Lcdo. Libertario Pérez Rodríguez, was a basketball team that did not enjoy as much success as their baseball counterparts. However, in the early 2000s, they showed a lot of progress by reaching the national playoffs various times. The team was a member of the BSN. In 2006, the team won its first BSN national basketball championship, defeating Flor Melendez and his Santurce Crabbers in five games.

Caguas is home to the Bairoa Gym, one of the most important boxing gyms in all Puerto Rico and a place where many local and visiting champions and otherwise notable boxers have trained at; such as boxing Welterweight Champion Miguel Cotto, his brother Jose Miguel, Alberto Mercado, Juan Carazo, Alfredo Escalera and others.

The Criollas de Caguas women's volleyball team has won 9 national Puerto Rico titles and has made it to the finals more than 15 times. The team is a member of the Liga de Voleibol Superior Femenino (LVSF).

The Criollos de Caguas FC soccer team is considered one of the most successful clubs in the island winning multiple tournaments and cups in Puerto Rican soccer including the National League Title in 2015.

Economy
In September 2005, city mayor William Miranda Marín levied the first municipal tax in Puerto Rico via city ordinance. Area merchants now charge a one cent tax for every dollar spent at all retail businesses. The tax has become known around the island as the "Willie Tax." It resulted in an estimated $500,000 monthly income for the city. However, the municipal tax was increased to 1.5% after the establishment of the 5.5% state tax, for a total of 7%, and the tax was declared illegal by the Puerto Rico's Supreme Court.

In 2006, Miranda Marín began calling Caguas "El Nuevo País de Caguas" ("The New Country of Caguas").

Agriculture
During the early part of the 20th century, Caguas hosted one of Puerto Rico's most important sugar manufacturers, which gave employment to thousands of Cagüeños.

Business
Numerous businesses and important buildings have opened in Caguas since the 1970s, including the imposing 23 story apartment building Caguas Tower, its adjacent competitors Bonneville Apartments, and the 10 floor Menonita Hospital. There are also several shopping centers:
Plaza del Carmen Mall
Plaza Centro Mall
Las Catalinas Mall
Los Prados Mall
Bairoa Shopping Center
Villa Blanca Mall
Angora Shopping Center
Plaza Degetau
Plaza Caguitas
Del Rio Shopping Center
Metro Plaza (Caguas, Puerto Rico)

Demographics

In 1899, the United States conducted its first census of Puerto Rico finding that the population of Caguas was 19,857.

In 2020, Caguas had a population of 127,244 compared to 142,893 in 2010. This shows an 11% decrease in the population in the municipality. The population density in 2020 was 2,200 people per square mile (830/km2). Hispanic or Latino of any race constitute 98.4% of the population of the municipality. There are also communities of Dominicans, Cubans and Colombians.

Government

All municipalities in Puerto Rico are administered by a mayor, elected every four years. The mayor of the city of Caguas were

1953 to 1969 - Angel Rivera PPD

1969 to 1973 - Miguel Hernandez Rodriguez (New Progressive Party (PNP))

1973 to 1977 - Angel O. Berrios Diaz (PPD)

1977 to 1981 - Miguel Hernandez Rodriguez (PNP)

1981 to 1997 - Angel O. Berrios Diaz (PPD)

1997 to 2010 - William Miranda Marín (PPD)

2010 to present - William Miranda Torres (PPD)

The city belongs to the Senatorial district VII (Humacao), which is represented by two Senators. In 2016, Miguel Laureano (PNP) and José Luis Dalmau (PPD) were elected as District Senators.

Symbols
The  or municipality has an official flag and coat of arms.

Flag and coat of arms
The colors blue and gold were chosen for the shield, distinctive of the city of Caguas. The figures symbolize both the indigenous and Christian origins of the city.

The coat of arms consists of a shield with a blue field. Upon the field are two sets of three golden arrows, forming a cross of St. Andrew. Above the cross is a crown which represents Caguax, cacique of the Turabo Valley region at the time of the arrival of the Spanish conquerors. Arrows were used as a remembrance of the first Christian place of worship established in the region which was dedicated under the patronage of St. Sebastian. There are pineapples interspersed to reflect the native agriculture. A castellated wall surmounts the shield to show the city's having been granted status as a municipality by the Spanish Crown.

On the flag, the shield sits atop another blue field on which the cross of arrows motif is repeated.

Transportation

Public transportation in Caguas, as in most of Puerto Rico, is limited to small "guaguas públicas" (Mini Bus). There is inexpensive but slow service to and from San Juan and Rio Piedras. Several buses and public taxi services serve the town to a limited degree. In 2019, 91.55% of the population relied on their own cars or carpool services to commute.

A "light interurban rail" system connecting Caguas to San Juan was in the planning stages and discarded due to lack of funding.

Caguas is served by one freeway, one tolled expressway and one main divided highway. Puerto Rico Highway 30 connects Caguas to the eastern part of the island. There is no freeway/expressway to the west, due mainly to the fact that there is no sufficient population west of Caguas to develop a new freeway or expressway; good access to the municipalities of Cidra (southwest) and Aguas Buenas (northwest) are possible via PR-172 and PR-156, respectively. Puerto Rico Highway 52 connects Caguas to the north (San Juan) and south (Cayey, Ponce). Puerto Rico Highway 1 is an alternate route to San Juan and Guaynabo with two lanes per direction; in south Caguas it becomes rural near Borinquen, therefore the only good access to Cayey is the expressway (PR-52) and a $1.00 toll has to be paid (only in the south direction). The only municipality bordering Caguas with a poor-access road is San Lorenzo, via PR-183; but good access to San Lorenzo is possible by entering Gurabo via PR-30, and then taking PR-203 south. Luis Muñoz Marín International Airport is about 35 minutes away by car.

There are 86 bridges in Caguas.

Education

High schools
Colegio Católico Notre Dame
Elohim Christian Academy
New Generation Christian Academy (formerly CLA)
Caguas Military Academy
Colegio Bautista
Colegio Católico San Juan Apóstol
Academia Cristo de los Milagros
Dr. Juan José Osuna High school
José Gautier Benítez High school
Escuela Libre de Música - Antonio S. Paoli
Manuela Toro Morice High School
Republic of Costa Rica Vocacional High School of Caguas
Eloisa Pascual "Bairoa III" High School
Rio Cañas High School
Santa Rosa Superior School
Thomas Alva Edison School
Colegio San José Superior
Escuela Secundaria Especializada en Ciencias, Matemáticas y Tecnología (CIMATEC)
Caguas Private School (CPS)

Higher education
San Juan Bautista School of Medicine
Huertas Junior College
Instituto EDIC
Columbia College
Turabo University at Gurabo (Gurabo, Puerto Rico)

Health care
Hospital Hima San Pablo
Menonita Caguas Regional Hospital
San Juan Bautista Medical Center
Corporacion SANOS

Sister cities
Caguas, Puerto Rico is twinned with Hartford, Connecticut and Southbridge, Massachusetts.

Gallery

See also

List of Puerto Ricans
History of Puerto Rico
Roman Catholic Diocese of Caguas

References

Further reading
Caguas and its barrios, United States Census Bureau

External links

Eastern Center Virtual Library 
Caguas Community Portal 
Huertas Junior College 
San Juan Bautista School of Medicine
Columbia College 
Grand Valley State University
Jardín Botánico y Cultural William Miranda Marín 

 
Municipalities of Puerto Rico
San Juan–Caguas–Guaynabo metropolitan area
Populated places established in 1775
1775 establishments in the Spanish West Indies
1770s establishments in Puerto Rico